WCVL 1550 AM is a radio station broadcasting a classic hits format. Licensed to Crawfordsville, Indiana, the station serves the west-central region of the state and is owned by Forcht Broadcasting.

References

External links
WCVL's official website

CVL
Radio stations established in 1965
1965 establishments in Indiana
Oldies radio stations in the United States
Crawfordsville, Indiana